Krasnoyarka (Kızıl-Ĵar) is a rural locality (a selo) in Ust-Koksinsky District, the Altai Republic, Russia. The population was 1 as of 2016. There is 1 street.

References 

Rural localities in Ust-Koksinsky District